Rafael Pavón (born 5 December 1951) is an Argentine footballer. He played in two matches for the Argentina national football team in 1975. He was also part of Argentina's squad for the 1975 Copa América tournament.

References

1951 births
Living people
Argentine footballers
Argentina international footballers
Place of birth missing (living people)
Association football defenders
Club Atlético Belgrano footballers
Deportivo Alavés players
Talleres de Córdoba footballers
Argentine expatriate footballers
Expatriate footballers in Spain